Protein FAM110A, also known as protein family with sequence similarity 110, A, C20orf55 or BA371L19.3 is encoded by the FAM110A gene. FAM110A is located on chromosome 20 and is a part of the greater FAM110 gene family, consisting of FAM110A, FAM110B, and FAM110C.

Gene

Overview 
In humans, FAM110A is located on the plus strand at 20p13. The gene transcript is found from base pairs 833,715 to 846,279, with a total transcript length of 12,564 base pairs. The FAM110A mRNA transcript is predicted to contain two exons. An upstream promoter region for FAM110A is predicted to be 1,111 base pairs long. Six different mRNA transcripts of FAM110A are predicted, all differing in their 5' untranslated regions.

Homology
219 organisms have been reported to have orthologs with the human FAM110A gene.

Regulation

Protein

Overview 
All human FAM110A transcript variants encode the same protein, which is 295 amino acids in length. The human FAM110A protein is projected to weigh 31.3 kiladaltons and have an isoelectric point of 10.5.

Human FAM110A is predicted to contain one standard deviation less than average frequencies of methionine, asparagine, and isoleucine residues, while containing one standard deviation higher frequencies of serine and proline residues. Human FAM110A is also predicted to contain a frequency of arginine residues two standard deviations higher than average. The presence of a high frequency of arginine residues is also apparent in the FAM110A chimpanzee, mouse, chicken and zebrafish orthologs, indicating that it may play a vital role to the function of the gene due to its high conservation.

FAM110A is predicted to be hydrophilic and soluble.

The tertiary structure of FAM110A is predicted to be 80% disordered.

Post-translational modification 
The N-terminal glycine residue FAM110A is not predicted to be myristolated (confidence: 0.97), indicating that FAM110A is not membrane-associated.

It is predicted that FAM110A contains no sulfation of tyrosine residues, suggesting that FAM110A is not secreted.

Phosphorylation analysis indicates FAM110A to be associated with the AGC and Akt kinase families.

Immunofluorescent analysis of FAM110A reveals the protein to be localized in the nucleoplasm, cytosol, and vesicles.

Interacting proteins

Clinical significance

Cancer pathogenesis 
FAM110A has been observed to be abnormally expressed in prostate cancer metastasis, where it co-localizes with E-cadherin and β-catenin at cell-cell adherens junctions, suggesting FAM110A’s involvement in the epithelial-to-mesenchymal transition in cancer pathogenesis. The greater FAM110 gene family is aberrantly methylated in breast cancer cells, and has been shown to be associated with reduced time to distant metastasis in breast cancer patients.

Cell cycle involvement 
FAM110A has been found to localize to centrosomes and accumulate at the microtubule organizing center in interphase and at spindle poles in mitosis.

References 

Genetics
Protein biochemistry